The 1964 European Judo Championships were the 13th edition of the European Judo Championships, and were held in East Berlin, East Germany on 25 and 26 April 1964. The Championships were held in three separate categories: junior (three events), amateur (five events), and professional (four events). The amateur contests were subdivided into four individual competitions, and a separate team competition, which was held in East Berlin on 18 May. The Soviet and other Socialist judokas were allowed to compete professionally but on a strictly non-profit basis. As before, more than one representative of a single national team were allowed to qualify for participation in each event. Soviet judokas won the judo crown, leading the overall medal table.

Medal overview

Juniors

Junior medal table

Amateurs

Amateur medal table

Professionals

Professional medal table

Teams

Overall medal table

References 

 
 
 Results of the 1964 European Junior Judo Championships (JudoInside.com)

E
European Judo Championships
Judo competitions in Germany
Sports competitions in East Berlin
1960s in Berlin
1964 in German sport
International sports competitions hosted by East Germany